Paslapčių namai (lit. The House of Secrets) is the Lithuanian version of Secret Story, based on the original French version. It started on March 2, 2013 on TV3, TV6 and TV8.

Housemates
 Andrius Braziulis is a 30-year-old IT scientist.
 Avgustina Issengel is a 20-year-old model and a dancer. Her father is from Brazil and her mother is from Belarus.
 Dileta Meškaitė is a 22-year-old singer.
 Elita Vilpišauskaitė is a 26-year-old homemaker.
 Ernestas Naučius is a 30-year-old father of two daughters.
 Gintautas Katulis is a 22-year-old psychology and theater student.
 Indrė Vožbutaitė is a 26-year-old, factory worker in England.
 Jolita Grubliauskaitė is a 29-year-old lawyer.
 Karolina Riaukaitė is a 23-year-old radio host.
 Laura Kuliešaitė is a 24-year-old law student and a model from Vilnius.
 Šarūnas Tamulis is a 24-year-old actor.
 Tomas Patašius is a 23-year-old, unemployed.
 Valdas Končius is a 24-year-old from Šiauliai. He has 8 brothers and sisters.
 Viktorija Česonytė is a 35-year-old psychologist and a business woman.
 Vytautas Kugelevičius is a 20-year-old who wants to work in TV.

Secrets

Nominations table

Notes

Nominations: Results

References 
 Official site 
 World of Big Brother

Secret Story (franchise)
2013 Lithuanian television series debuts
2013 Lithuanian television series endings
Lithuanian television series
2010s Lithuanian television series
Lithuanian reality television series
TV3 (Lithuania) original programming